White Pass & Yukon Route 73 is an operating narrow-gauge  "Mikado" type steam locomotive.  It was built by the Baldwin Locomotive Works for the White Pass and Yukon Route in May 1947.  After retirement on June 30, 1964, the locomotive was moved to Bennett, British Columbia, in 1968 for static display. In 1979, the locomotive was moved again to Whitehorse, Yukon, this time to be restored to operating condition. Restoration was completed in 1982 and the locomotive has been back in service since then. It is currently the larger of two operating steam locomotives on the line.

References

Baldwin locomotives
2-8-2 locomotives
3 ft gauge locomotives
Preserved steam locomotives of Canada
Individual locomotives of the United States
Individual locomotives of Canada

Preserved steam locomotives of Alaska